A Encomenda (San Antonio) is a parish in A Pobra de Trives municipality, Ourense province, Galicia region of north-west Spain. It lies towards the north-east of the province.

As of 2009, the population of A Encomenda was 123 (60 males).

References

Parishes in A Pobra de Trives